Saeid Afrooz (born 13 December 1990) is an Iranian Paralympic athlete. He represented Iran at the 2020 Summer Paralympics in Tokyo, Japan and won the gold medal in the men's javelin throw F34 event.

References

External links 
 

1990 births
Living people
People from Kerman Province
Paralympic athletes of Iran
Medalists at the 2020 Summer Paralympics
Athletes (track and field) at the 2020 Summer Paralympics
Paralympic gold medalists for Iran
Paralympic medalists in athletics (track and field)
Iranian male javelin throwers
21st-century Iranian people